Matheus Trindade Gonçalves (born 6 March 1996) is a Brazilian professional footballer who plays as a midfielder for Brusque.

Career

Flamengo
Born in Rio de Janeiro, Matheus started his career in the youth academy of Flamengo, although he never played an official match for the club, being loaned to several clubs before being released in the end of 2018.

FC Goa (loan)
In August 2016, Matheus signed with Indian Super League side Goa on loan until January. Gonçalves made his professional debut for Goa on 4 October 2016 in their opening match against NorthEast United.

Tombense
In January 2019, Gonçalves joined Tombense.

Career statistics

Honours 
Ceará
Campeonato Cearense: 2017

Náutico
Campeonato Pernambucano: 2021

References

External links
 Indian Super League Profile.

1996 births
Living people
Footballers from Rio de Janeiro (city)
Brazilian footballers
CR Flamengo footballers
FC Goa players
Atlético Clube Goianiense players
Tombense Futebol Clube players
Clube Náutico Capibaribe players
Association football midfielders
Campeonato Brasileiro Série B players
Campeonato Brasileiro Série C players
Campeonato Brasileiro Série D players
Indian Super League players
Expatriate footballers in India